Daniel Guzmán may refer to:
 Daniel Guzmán (footballer) (born 1965), Mexican footballer and manager;
 Daniel Guzmán (actor) (born 1972) Spanish actor and filmmaker;
 Daniel Guzmán Jr. (born 1992), Mexican footballer.